Peronospora arborescens is a plant pathogen. It causes downy mildew on leaves of Papaver spp. It has economic importance on Papaver somniferum grown as an oilseed crop, for example in central and eastern Europe. It is controlled by sanitation, crop rotation, use of clean seed and fungicide sprays of the foliage.  

There are other species of Peronospora which occur on Papaver: Peronospora argemones (Gäum.), Peronospora cristata (Tranzschel), and Peronospora papaveris-pilosi (Vienn.-Bourg.).

References

Further reading

External links

Peronosporales
Species described in 1855
Water mould plant pathogens and diseases
Food plant pathogens and diseases